George Messier (1896–1933) was a French inventor who is best known as the pioneer of hydraulically-operated landing gear for aircraft. He also specialized in hydropneumatic suspensions.

Notes

External links
History of the Messier Company (In French)

1896 births
1933 deaths
20th-century French inventors